The 2021 Carling Black Label Cup was the ninth edition of the Carling Black Label Cup to be held.

Venue
The Orlando Stadium was chosen to host this annual event. The stadium located in Orlando, the Soweto area of Johannesburg, South Africa

Notes

Soccer cup competitions in South Africa
Carling